Olivia Lux (born March 14, 1994), also known as Liv Lux Miyake-Mugler, is the stage name of Fred Carlton, an American drag performer most known for competing on season 13 of RuPaul's Drag Race. Liv joined the House of Miyake-Mugler in November 2021 and in February 2022 announced that she would be changing her name to Liv Lux Miyake-Mugler.

Career
Liv grew up in Buena Vista Township and nearby Vineland. She graduated from Montclair State University.

Liv competed on season 13 of RuPaul's Drag Race under the name of Olivia Lux. She placed in the top five, losing her spot in the finale after losing a lip-sync to Kandy Muse.  On the second episode of the season, Liv placed in the top, but lost the lip-sync for the win to Symone. In the sixth and seventh episodes of the season, Liv won the main challenges, winning two cash prizes of $5,000. She became a member of the House of Miyake-Mugler who won season 2 of Legendary, and made her debut in the competitive ballroom scene in 2021. She was also cast in X-Mas X-Travaganza - Shantay You Sleigh in 2021.

Personal life
Originally from New Jersey, Liv Lux lives in Brooklyn, as of 2021. She dances, sings, and writes music. Her original drag name came from Olivia Pope from Scandal, and the Latin word for light.

Filmography

Television

Music videos

References

External links

 Olivia Lux at IMDb

Living people
American drag queens
Montclair State University alumni
People from Atlantic County, New Jersey
People from Brooklyn
People from Vineland, New Jersey
Olivia Lux
1994 births